Jörg Friedrich may refer to:

Jörg Friedrich (author), German author
Jörg Friedrich (rower), German rower
Jörg Friedrich (architect), German architect